The Pentax SF7 was a camera from the Japanese Pentax brand, manufactured by the Asahi Optical Co., Ltd. (called PENTAX Corporation since 2002). It is also known as the Pentax SF10 in the United States, and was first produced in 1988. It was Pentax's third Autofocus 35mm SLR after the Pentax ME F and the very similar Pentax SFX.

Features
 Two auto-focus modes: single shot (focus priority) or continuous (servo) 
 Shutter speed range, from 30 seconds to 1/2000th sec and Bulb. 
 Motor drive transports at 2.0 frame/s

See also
 List of Pentax products

External links

SF7
135 film cameras
Pentax K-mount cameras